Events from the year 1309 in the Kingdom of Scotland.

Incumbents
Monarch – Robert I

Events
 17 March – Robert the Bruce holds his first Parliament at St. Andrews

Deaths
 16 July – James Stewart, 5th High Steward of Scotland, Guardian of Scotland during the First Interregnum

See also

 Timeline of Scottish history

References

 
Years of the 14th century in Scotland
Wars of Scottish Independence